Linda Mkhize (22 June 1981 – 8 August 2018), better known by his stage name PRO and formerly as Pro Kid, was a South African rapper and producer. He was known for rapping in a mixture of South African township Soweto vernacular (tsotsi taal) and English. His music spoke on township realities. Mkhize contributed to the development of kasi rap & his regarded as one of the pioneers of SA Hip-Hop. His work created opportunities and influence other artists such as AKA, Micky m, Red Button, Siya Shezi(Deep soweto), F-eezy,Chippa M K.O, Maseven, Touchline, Emtee, Kwesta and his younger brother DJ Citilyts and many more Kasi rap emcees.

Life and career  
Linda Mkhize was born and raised in Klipspruit, Soweto. When he was a teenager, he would take part in rap battles and cyphers, to showcase his skills. In 2004, he went on to win an emcee battle competition hosted by Tbo Touch. On the urban youth radio station YFM, his success on this show is what led to his breakthrough record deal. In 2017, he co-hosted the SABC 1 rap battle competition One Mic for two seasons  along with Big Zulu. He became famous after the release of his first single "Soweto". The song is an ode to his birthplace Soweto. It was produced by his long-time producer and collaborator, Omen The Chef. A follow up on that was a song called, "Wozobona" which gained widespread popularity in South Africa and set the path for his debut album Heads & Tales in 2005.

Discography

Studio albums
 Heads & Tales (2005)
 DNA (2006)
 Dankie San (2008)
 Snakes & Ladders (2010)
 Continua (2012)

Death
Mkhize died on 8 August 2018 after a seizure, while visiting a friend in Johannesburg CBD. After the announcement of his death, media stations across the country produced tributes to him.

References

External links 
Memorial service for Linda 'Prokid' Mkhize

1981 births
2018 deaths
South African DJs
Electronic dance music DJs
People from Soweto